Zachary "Zak" Swanson (born 28 September 2000) is an English footballer who currently plays as a right-back for Portsmouth .

Club career
Born in Cambridge, Swanson joined Arsenal at the age of 6 and signed his first professional contract with the club in April 2019. In August 2020, Swanson joined Dutch Eerste Divisie side MVV Maastricht on a season-long loan deal. After making just three appearances, he was recalled in December 2020.

On 4 July 2022, Swanson signed for League One side Portsmouth for an undisclosed fee on a two-year deal with the option for a further year. On 29 October 2022, he scored his first senior goal in a 1–1 draw with Shrewsbury Town.

Media
Swanson was involved in the Amazon Original sports docuseries All or Nothing: Arsenal, which documented the club by spending time with the coaching staff and players behind the scenes both on and off the field throughout their 2021–22 season.

Career statistics

Club

Notes

References

2000 births
Living people
English footballers
Sportspeople from Cambridge
Footballers from Cambridgeshire
Association football defenders
Arsenal F.C. players
MVV Maastricht players
Portsmouth F.C. players
Eerste Divisie players
English Football League players
English expatriate footballers
Expatriate footballers in the Netherlands
English expatriate sportspeople in the Netherlands